David Andronic (born 9 July 1995) is a Moldovan professional footballer.

Career

Resovia
After a spell with FC Milsami Orhei, it was confirmed on 29 January 2020, that Andronic had joined Polish club Resovia after playing three friendly games for the club. However, less than one month later, the club announced that he wouldn't join the club anyway, due to formal and legal reasons.

Olimpia Grudziądz
On 5 June 2020, he joined Olimpia Grudziądz.

References

External links 
 
 Profile on footballdatabase.eu

1995 births
Living people
Footballers from Chișinău
Moldovan footballers
Moldovan expatriate footballers
Association football midfielders
Speranța Nisporeni players
FK Atlantas players
PAS Lamia 1964 players
Trikala F.C. players
FC Milsami Orhei players
Resovia (football) players
Olimpia Grudziądz players
Moldovan Super Liga players
Super League Greece players
Football League (Greece) players
A Lyga players
II liga players
Moldovan expatriate sportspeople in Lithuania
Moldovan expatriate sportspeople in Greece
Moldovan expatriate sportspeople in Poland
Expatriate footballers in Lithuania
Expatriate footballers in Greece
Expatriate footballers in Poland